Oberea sobosana is a species of beetle in the family Cerambycidae. It was described by Ohbayashi in 1956.

References

Beetles described in 1956
sobosana